Rashi Rao is an Indian model who was crowned Miss Earth India 2016. Rashi represented India at the Miss Earth 2016 pageant.

Rao was one of the finalists at the Miss Diva 2015 pageant. She was crowned as Miss Earth India in 2016. She succeeded Miss Earth India 2015, Aaital Khosla, and represented India in Miss Earth 2016 held in Philippines. She represented India in Ghana in Trash in bin campaign in 2017 as Miss India.

References

External links
 

Living people
Indian beauty pageant winners
Miss Earth India delegates
People from Gurgaon
Female models from Haryana
Delhi University alumni
Year of birth missing (living people)
Miss Earth 2016 contestants